Omphaloscelis polybela is a moth of the family Noctuidae. It is found in North Africa, from Algeria at least to Libya.

Subspecies
Omphaloscelis polybela polybela (Algeria)
Omphaloscelis polybela teukyrana (Libya)

Omphaloscelis